Joshua N. Evans (born June 5, 1991) is a former American football safety. He played college football at the University of Florida, and was drafted by the Jacksonville Jaguars in the sixth round of the 2013 NFL Draft.

Early years
Evans attended Irvington High School in Irvington, New Jersey.  He played high school football for the Irvington Blue Knights, playing on both offense and defense.  He rushed for 1,403 yards and 14 touchdowns, and completed 123 of 190 pass attempts for 1,856 yards and 18 touchdowns.  Evans also recorded 78 tackles and seven interceptions on defense during his senior year.  Following his senior season, the Star-Ledger recognized him as he Essex County Player of the Year, and he received first-team all-state honors.

Also an standout track & field athlete, Evans competed in hurdles, relays and the jumps, and led Irvington to the New Jersey Group III state championship. At the 2008 NJSIAA Group Championships, he took silver in the 110-meter hurdles (13.91 s), placed 9th in the 200-meter dash (22.22 s) and finished 6th in the 400-meter hurdles (55.19 s). He captured the state title in the 55-meter hurdles at the 2009 NJSIAA Meet of Champions, with a PR time of 7.40 seconds. He got a personal-best time of 7.98 seconds in the 60-meter hurdles at the 2009 National Scholastic Indoor Championships, where he took 5th.

College career
Evans accepted an athletic scholarship to attend the University of Florida, and played for coach Urban Meyer and coach Will Muschamp's Florida Gators football teams from 2009 to 2012.  He started 24 of 47 games in which he appeared for the Gators during his four-year college career, compiling a total of 154 tackles.  As a senior in 2012, he distinguished himself in the Gators' 14–7 win over the Missouri Tigers, leading the team with twelve tackles.

Professional career

Jacksonville Jaguars
The Jacksonville Jaguars chose Evans in the sixth round, with the 169th overall pick, of the 2013 NFL Draft.  Evans officially signed with the Jaguars on July 18, 2013. Evans finished with 58 tackles as a rookie.

Evans played in all 16 games with 14 starts, recording 90 tackles in his second season.

On September 3, 2016, Evans was released by the Jaguars.

Washington Redskins
On October 5, 2016, Evans was signed by the Washington Redskins. He was released by the Redskins on October 28, 2016. He was re-signed to a two-year deal on December 28 after Donte Whitner was placed on injured reserve.

Evans was released by the Redskins on August 3, 2017.

Orlando Apollos
Evans signed with the Orlando Apollos of the Alliance of American Football (AAF) for the 2019 season. The league ceased operations in April 2019.

On August 16, 2021, Evans announced his retirement from the NFL.

See also 

 List of Florida Gators in the NFL Draft
 List of University of Florida alumni

References

External links 
 Washington Redskins bio
  Jacksonville Jaguars bio
  Florida Gators bio

1991 births
Living people
People from Irvington, New Jersey
Sportspeople from Essex County, New Jersey
Players of American football from New Jersey
American football safeties
Irvington High School (New Jersey) alumni
Florida Gators football players
Jacksonville Jaguars players
Washington Redskins players
Orlando Apollos players